Olearia colensoi, commonly known as tūpare (from the Māori ) or leatherwood,  is a sub-alpine shrub that is endemic to New Zealand.

Olearia colensoi can grow into a tree 10 metres high that has thick, serrated leaves. The bark is light brown and papery with branches covered in woolly hairs. The flowers are typically dark red or yellow.

References

External links

Landcare Research Ngā Tipu o Aotearoa - New Zealand Plants (database)

Flora of New Zealand
colensoi
Plants used in traditional Māori medicine